Potato wedges are irregular wedge-shaped slices of potato, often large and unpeeled, that are either baked or fried. They are sold at diners and fast food restaurants. They are usually seasoned with a variety of spices, commonly paprika, salt and pepper.

In Australia, potato wedges are a common bar food, that are almost always served with some kind of sauce. One may use sour cream, sweet chilli sauce, ketchup, or some combination of these. In Ireland, spicy potato wedges are a common item served at hot deli counters.

Other names

In some regions of the United States, particularly Idaho, Oregon, Washington, Montana, Minnesota, Nebraska, Northern Utah, Northeast Ohio, Wisconsin and Upstate New York, a popular variation of potato wedges are known as jojos. Jojos are potato wedges that are battered, seasoned, and either deep-fried in the same vat as fried chicken, or pressure-fried.

See also 

 List of hors d'oeuvre

References

Appetizers
Potato dishes
Australian cuisine
New Zealand cuisine
American vegetable dishes

ja:フライドポテト